The Chiriqui yellowthroat (Geothlypis chiriquensis) is a New World warbler. It has a number of separate resident breeding populations in Central America from southwestern Costa Rica to Panama. It was previously considered a subspecies of the masked yellowthroat.

The breeding habitat is marshes and other wet areas with dense low vegetation.  

The Chiriqui yellowthroat is usually seen in pairs, and does not associate with other species. It is often skulking, but may pop up occasionally, especially to sing. It feeds on insects, including caterpillars, dragonflies, damselflies,
grasshoppers and beetles, and spiders, which are usually captured in dense vegetation. The call is a fast chattering, quite unlike that of other yellowthroat species, and a more typical sharp chip.

References

 New World Warblers by Curson, Quinn and Beadle, 

 A guide to the birds of Costa Rica by Stiles and Skutch 

Geothlypis
Birds of North America
Birds described in 1872
Taxa named by Osbert Salvin